Gary Leo Ellis Jr. (born March 21, 1966 in Tacoma, Washington, U.S.) was one of the last American "Old School" professional bicycle motocross (BMX) racer whose careers started in the 1970s to early 1980s. His prime competitive years were from 1982 to 1996.  He was nicknamed "The Lumberjack".

Just like Tommy Brackens was nicknamed "The Human Dragster", "The Lumberjack" was coined for Ellis by the BMX "play by play" announcers at nationals. By the age of 16 he was  6' 2" tall and 190 lbs (ultimately growing to 6' 3").  He also had a thick beard and mustache making him look  meaner and older than his years. The place of his birth was also a factor in the nickname since it was a stereotypically American lumberjack region of the United States.  Plus, there was an apocryphal story that he sawed down a tree that was in the right of way of a practice track he was building in his front yard. The appellation stuck and he had it throughout the majority of his long 21-year career.

Racing career milestones

He started racing in 1977 at age 11 after he saw a BMX display at a car show and he asked his father if he could race. His father, Gary Leo Ellis Sr., is a 1987 ABA Hall of Fame Inductee for the track operator with the longest continuously operating track in the country.
His first race bicycle was a Schwinn Sting-Ray.
His first local race result was fourth place at the Tacoma Jaycees BMX track.
The sanctioning body was Northwest Bicycle Motocross Association (NWBMXA), a short lived regional governing body in Washington State.
His first national amateur win was at an American Bicycle Association (ABA) in 15 Expert in Portland, Oregon in 1981.
His first sponsor was Pedal Pushers Bike Shop in 1979.
He turned professional on December 1983 at age 17.

His first pro race result was a first place in junior "A" pro at the joint 1983 American Bicycle Association (ABA)/Canadian American Bicycle Association (CABA) Canadian-American BMX Championships pre race in Monroe, Washington on December 10, 1983.

His first senior pro** race result was a seventh place in "A" Pro at the National Bicycle League (NBL) Celebrity Race For Childhelp USA/International in Azusa, California, on January 22, 1984. He moved himself up to "A" pro after the 1983 Jag World Super Bowl Championship which was held on December 29, 1983. This was a charity event.
His first Senior Pro win was in 1989. Gary Ellis became the first ABA pro national No.1 in its history come from outside of California.

He retired November 1998, after the 1998 ABA Grand National, age 32.

*In the NBL "B" Pro/Super Class/"A" Pro/Junior Elite Men depending on the era; in the ABA it is "A" Pro.
**In the NBL it is "AA" Pro/Elite Men; in the ABA it is "AA" Pro.

Career factory and major bicycle shop sponsors

Note: This listing only denotes the racer's primary sponsors. At any given time a racer could have numerous co-sponsors. Primary sponsorships can be verified by BMX press coverage and sponsor's advertisements at the time in question. When possible exact dates are given.

Amateur
Pedal Pushers Bike Shop: 1979
Robinson Racing Products: 1979-December 1981. Began as a co-sponsorship through his bike shop Pedal Pushers.
Kuwahara Cycles, Ltd.: January 1982-Early September 1984. Turned pro while on Kuwhahara. "Kuwahara" means "Mulberry Meadows" in Japanese. The company is named after Sentaro Kuwahara who founded the company in 1916 in Osaka, Japan.

Professional

Kuwahara Cycles, Ltd.: January 1982-Early September 1984. Ellis quit due to a salary dispute with Kuwhahara a week after the NBL Grand National held on September 1 & 2.
Flying W (bike shop): September 8, 1984 – September 22, 1984. Interim sponsor between Kuwhahara and Huffy.
Huffy Corporation: September 23, 1984 – March 20, 1986. Gary was sponsorless for over a month after Huffy dropped him.
GT (Gary Turner) Racing & GT Bicycles/WD-40: April 27, 1986-November 1998.

Career bicycle motocross titles

Note: Listed are district, state/provincial/department, regional, national, and international titles in italics. "Defunct" refers to the fact of that sanctioning body in question no longer existing at the start of the racer's career or at that stage of his/her career. Depending on point totals of individual racers, winners of Grand Nationals do not necessarily win national titles. Series and one off championships are also listed in block.

Amateur

National Bicycle Association (NBA)
None
National Bicycle League (NBL)
1982 15 Expert Grandnational Champion
American Bicycle Association (ABA)
1982 16 Expert 2nd place Jag World Champion (ABA Sanctioned)
1983 17 & Over Expert Gold Cup Champion
1983 17 & Over Expert National No.1 Amateur*
1983 National No.2*

*Beginning with the 1983 season the ABA instituted age class rankings, much like NBL practice. However, the overall National No. 1 Amateur title was retained. Doug Davis was overall National No. 1 Amateur for 1983.

United States Bicycle Motocross Association (USBA)

International Bicycle Motorcross Federation (IBMXF)

1983 16 & Over Expert World Champion

Fédération Internationale Amateur de Cyclisme (FIAC)*
None
Union Cycliste Internationale (UCI)*

*See note in Professional section.

Professional

National Bicycle Association (NBA)
None
National Bicycle League (NBL)
1984 "A" pro Grandnational Champion
1987 "A" Pro Grandnational Champion
1988 "A" Pro Grandnational Champion
1988 National No.2 Pro
1989, 1994 National No.1 Pro
1998 Pro Class Grandnational Champion*

*In his last NBL race ever, the 1998 NBL Grand National held on September 6, 1998, in Louisville, Kentucky, he scored a perfect three wins in the pro main motos which as was BMX standard procedure for the pros, both ABA and NBL were run three times to minimize luck and to reward consistency. This performance that lead to his victory as Grand National Champion, (albeit not National No. 1) was the capstone of his reputation as being at his best under pressure at very important races.

American Bicycle Association (ABA)
1984 Canadian-American (Can-Am) Pro Champion.
1984 "AA" pro Grandnational Champion
1984 National No.2 Pro
1985 National No.3 Pro
1987 "AA" Pro Grandnational Champion
1988 "AA" Pro Grandnational Champion
1989 "AA" Pro U.S. Gold Cup West Champion
1989 "AA" Pro U.S. Gold Cup East Champion
1990 "AA" Pro U.S. Open West Champion
1989 National No.1 Pro Prize won: 1989 Chevy S-10 Pickup
1990 National No.1 Pro Prize won: 1990 Isuzu Pickup
1994 "AA" Pro Gold Cup West Champion
1994 "AA" Pro Grandnational Champion
1994 National No.1 Pro Prize won: 1995 Ford F150 Pick-up truck.
1995 National No.1 Pro* Prize Won: 1995 Jeep Wrangler
1994 Pro Supercup Champion Prize: Big Screen Television by Herda.

*There is controversy surrounding Gary Ellis's 1995 title. That year, Frenchman Christophe Lévêque, was the actual points winner. He was not awarded the title or the automobile prize that went with it due to a rule in the ABA rule book that required the winner of the ABA No. 1 Pro title to be a U.S. citizen. Lévêque was permitted to race the season and collected points, but the rule remained, as another ABA rule prevented rule changes from being made during a race season. As a result, Ellis was rewarded the title. The controversial rule was changed for the following season.
United States Bicycle Motocross Association (USBA)

None
International Bicycle Motorcross Federation (IBMXF)*

1985, 1987, 1988, 1993 Pro World Champion
1995 20" Superclass Silver Medal World Champion

Fédération Internationale Amateur de Cyclisme (FIAC)*
None (FIAC did not have a strictly professional division during its existence).
Union Cycliste Internationale (UCI)*
None

*Note: Beginning in 1991 the IBMXF and FIAC, the amateur cycling arm of the UCI, had been holding joint world championship events as a transitional phase in merging which began in earnest in 1993. Beginning with the 1996 season the IBMXF and FIAC completed the merger and both ceased to exist as independent entities being integrated into the UCI. Beginning with the 1996 World Championships held in Brighton, England, the UCI would officially hold and sanction BMX world championships and with it inherited all precedents, records, streaks, etc. from both the IBMXF and FIAC.

Independent Invitationals and Pro Series/single races

1983 "B" Pro and Pro Trophy Jag Super Bowl World Champion

Notable accolades
Named as one of BMX Actions "Terrible Ten" of the 10 world's fastest amateurs to watch in 1983 as potential future top pros.
Named as one of BMX Actions "1984's Hottest Rookie Pros."
1990 BMX Plus! "Racer of the Year" with 61% of the vote receiving 846 votes of approximately 1,387 cast. Won a Yamaha RT-180 MX motorcycle.
1990 Go Number One Racer Award (NORA) Cup winner.
1991 BMX Plus! "Racer of the Year" with 42% of the vote. Total votes not given nor derivable. Won a custom painted helmet by Bob's Krazy Brush.
 1994 & 1996 winner of the ABA BMXer magazine "Racer of the Year" award.
1995 BMX Plus! "Racer of the Year"
1996 BMX Plus! "Racer of the Year" with 22% of the votes cast. No total votes given.
1991 Go Number One Racer Award (NORA) Cup winner**
1998 Snap BMX Magazine*** NORA Cup winner with 20.2% of the vote. Total votes not given. Prize won: A Honda CR-125 motocross motorcycle.
On the cover of 48 various BMX magazine covers. The July 1982 issue of BMX Plus! being his first one.
Gary Ellis is a 1998 ABA Hall of Fame Inductee.* Go was BMX Action/Freestylin new name until its demise in 1992.**This was the very last NORA Cup to be awarded before Go ceased publishing. The NORA Cup would not be awarded for another six years until 1998 when Snap magazine brought it back with Gary Ellis winning in 1998.*** Snap BMX Magazine, by acquiring the rights to the NORA Cup, became the spiritual heir to BMX Action/Freestylin magazine, which ceased publication in 1992 as GO magazine.

Significant injuries

He has only three notable injuries over his career, which explains in part its 15-year longevity. Many pros like Mike Poulson for instance or even top amateurs have had otherwise promising careers cut short by multiple serious injuries. Some other top pros like Tinker Juarez who in addition to a 12-year BMX career went on to have a 20-year mountain bike racing (MTB) and road racing careers has been fortunate to have remained remarkably injury free. However, Gary Ellis did have them:
Had a hand injury that kept him out of the 1995 ABA Winternationals in Scottsdale, Arizona (held on the weekend of March 19, 1996).
Received a toe injury when the starting gate fell on it during a practice session at the 1996 UCI World Championships in Brighton, England. He stayed overnight in an English hospital before being flown back to the United States for surgery. He was laid up for approximately five months before returning to the circuit in November 1996.

Racing traits and habits
 As a professional he was described as emotionless at races.

Post BMX career

Like many former BMXers they have either returned to motorcycle motocross or picked it up for the first time. Gary Ellis revisited it. He also likes to relax riding his Harley-Davidson motorcycle. Unlike many former top pro BMXers, he has never raced again in BMX after his retirement in 1998, not even the Veteran and Masters classes in the ABA and NBL respectively, not even for fun. On the occasion of his last NBL race the 1998 NBL Grand National in which he scored a perfect 1-1-1 score, i.e. winning all three of the mains he made a vow not to come back after he retired. Many pros like Turnell Henry, Frank Post and Brian Patterson raced after their official or unofficial retirements from BMX racing. Many like Stu Thomsen just raced basically for fun once or twice a year. Some like Eric Rupe and Harry Leary made it a second career to race in the junior "A" pros and/or ABA's Veteran Pro and NBL's Masters classes. Unlike them Gary Ellis did not come back:

BMX Plus!: Stu Thomsen retired from racing in '86 but he raced Pro Open at the Fallnationals a few years later. After this year is over and you retire, do you think you will race Pro again some time in the future...even just for fun?

Gary: No. When I'm done, I'm gonna be done. I'm not gonna go back out and do it again. I don't plan on it anyway.

--Gary Ellis BMX Plus! January 1999

As of November 2008 he has been as good as his word and not raced BMX in any capacity.

However, this does not mean he totally abandoned BMX. He became the non racing team manager of the Nirve BMX Team in early June 1999.

BMX and general press magazine articles and interviews
"Gary Ellis: Kuwahara's Mr. Low Key" BMX Plus! October 1983 Vol.6 No.9* pg.40
"Sharpshootin'" side bar. BMX Action April 1984 Vol.9 No.4 pg.69
"Interview: Gary Ellis" BMX Action May 1984 Vol.9 No.5 pg.56
Mini-interview BMX Action August 1985 Vol.10 No.8 pg.46 Commentary on his race performance.
"Interview With A Pro World Champion" Super BMX Presents The 1985 World Championship Winter 1985 pg.70 This was a Special Edition published by Challenge Publications devoted to covering the 1985 IBMXF World Championships.
"Tom and Gary: Not to be confused with the cat and mouse" BMX Action February 1987 Vol.12 No.2 pg.64 Joint interview with Tommy Brackens.
"Gary Ellis..." BMX Action December 1987 Vol.12 No.12 pg.24
"Get To Know Gary Ellis" BMX Action June 1988 Vol.13 No.6 pg.18
Gold Cup West mini interview. American BMXer November 1989 Vol.11 No.10 pg.18 & 29 Very brief interviews taken after Gold Cup wins.
"Gary Ellis: Winning's His Business And Business Is Good" American BMXer December 1990 Vol.12 No.11 pg.30
"Final NBL A Pro Standings" BMX Plus! January 1990 Vol.13 No.1 pg.67 Brief interview with Ellis describing how it felt to win the NBL pro title. Included is a list of the top 10 pros of the NBL in 1989.
"The Lumberjack" BMX Plus! April 1990 Vol.13 No.4 pg.42
Gary Ellis's BMX Plus! "Racer of the Year" interview BMX Plus! June 1991 Vol.14 No.6 pg.44
"Gary Ellis" BMX Plus! August 1994 Vol.17 No.8 pg.63
"Gary Ellis: At home with 'The Lumberjack'" BMX Plus! April 1995 Vol.18 No.4 pg.56
"Gary Goes Aluminum!" BMX Plus! July 1995 Vol.18 No.7 pg.54 Mini interview where Gary discuss his switch from chromoly to aluminum bicycle frames.
"Number One: Gary Ellis" Snap BMX Magazine March/April 1996 Vol.3 Iss.2 No.9 Short interview with Ellis after his winning the 1995 ABA No.1 Pro title focusing on the ABA's denial of awarding Christophe Lévêque the title.
"Gary Ellis Here And Now, The Number One Rider" Snap BMX Magazine January/February 1998 Vol. 5 Iss.1 No.20 pg.47
"Gary Ellis The Lumberjack prepares to hang up his ax" BMX Rider Fall 1998 Vol.1 No.1 (Premier issue) pg.55
"When He's Gone, He's Really Gone..." BMX Plus! January 1999 Vol.22 No.1 pg.45*Due to a change of printing companies, BMX Plus! technically did not have a May 1983 issue. The issue succeeding April's was called the June issue.

BMX magazine coversBicycle Motocross News:
 None
Minicycle/BMX Action & Super BMX:
Super BMX Presents The 1985 World Championship Winter 1985. (47) in the lead with Harry Leary (85) in the rear foreground in second, Brian Patterson to Gary's left in third and Eric Rupe in fourth to Harry Leary's behind/left.
January 1988 Vol.15 No.1 with Eric Rupe. In inset Freestyler Denny Howell.(SBMX&F)
September 1988 Vol.15 No.9 with Charles Townsend and Greg Hill (SBMXF) In insert freestyler Matt Hoffman.
Bicycle Motocross Action & Go:
January 1987 Vol.12 No.1 (BMXA)
December 1988 Vol.13 No.12 (BMXA)
April 1990 Vol.1 Iss.6 main image. In insert freestyler Matt Hoffman (Go).
September 1990 Vol.1 Iss.11 in insert. Main images is freestyler Rick Moliterno (Go).
BMX Plus!:
July 1982 Vol.5 No.7 Gary's first cover ever.
May 1985 Vol.8 No.5 in insert with Pete Loncarevich, Tommy Brackens, Ronnie Anderson & Eddy King; Scott Clark in circular insert; freestyler Martin Aparijo insert; and freestyler Chris Meier as main image.
December 1985 Vol.8 No.12 with Pete Loncarevich (16) and Tommy Brackens (3). Also Dizz Hicks and Brian Scura (building quarter pipe) in separate inserts.
August 1986 Vol.9 No.8 In insert behind Scott Clark (10) and Shawn Texas (falling). Main image freestyler Ron Wilkerson.
September 1986 Vol.9 No.9 in photo composite behind Greg Hill (1), Tommy Brackens, Eric Rupe (1) and unidentified (15). Freestyler Eddie Fiola "above" them.
December 1986 Vol.9 No.12. (1x) in top insert ahead of unidentified (7). In separate insert freestyle Ken Powers. Main Image: Scott Towne.
August 1987 Vol.10 No.8 in bottom insert (6) slightly ahead of Greg Hill (3) and ahead of Charles Townsend (CW) and ahead of unidentified (23). Top insert freestyler John Ludvigson; Main image: freestyler Matt Hoffman.
May 1989 Vol.12 No.5
March 1990 Vol.13 No.3
October 1991 Vol.14 No.10 with Pete Loncarevich, Todd Corbitt & Steve Veltman.
July 1992 Vol.15 No.7 (2)in left center insert behind Pete Loncarevich (1) and ahead of two unidentifies (4) & (13). In right center insert unidentifieds; in bottom insert unidentifieds; in top insert freestyler Matt Hoffman.
December 1992 Vol.15 No.12 (2) in top insert center in a dead tie with Pete Loncarevich (1) in foreground and Charles Townsend (3) in background. In right center insert Tim Judge circa 1984; in bottom left insert unidentified BMXer and MXer. Main image freestylers Brian Blyther & Ron Wilkerson in 1986.
February 1994 Vol.17 No.2 in second place in background slightly behind Billy Griggs and ahead of unidentified racer in third place.
May 1994 Vol.17 No.5 ahead of the Foster Brothers Alan (4) in third & Brian in second place.
August 1994 Vol.17 No.8 in foreground with Eric Carter in background.
March 1995 Vol.18 No.3
Total BMX:

Bicycles and Dirt:
March 1983 Vol.1 No.7 in inset with Unidentified racer. Main picture: Steve Veltman.
September 1984 Vol.2 No.10 with Cheri Elliott and Brit Audeoud in separate frames.
Snap BMX Magazine & Transworld BMX:
November/December 1995 Vol.2 No.6 Iss.7
NBA World & NBmxA World (The official NBA/NBmxA publication):

Bicycle Today & BMX Today (The official NBL publication under two names):
Bicycle Today September 1989
ABA Action, American BMXer, BMXer (The official ABA publication under three names):
American BMXer January/February 1986 Vol.8 No.1
American BMXer March 1987 Vol.9 No.2 (3) ahead of Charles Townsend (15) in second, obscured unidentified in third and Todd Slavik (4) in fourth place.
American BMXer December 1990 Vol.12 No.11
USBA Racer: (The official USBA membership publication):

References

External links
 The American Bicycle Association (ABA) sebsite
 The National Bicycle League (NBL) website

1966 births
American male cyclists
BMX riders
Living people